Baby Driver is a 2017 action-crime film.

Baby Driver may also refer to:

 Baby Driver – Music from the Motion Picture, the soundtrack album to the film Baby Driver
 Baby Driver, a 1981 novel by Jan Kerouac
 "Baby Driver", a song by Simon and Garfunkel from Bridge over Troubled Water
 "Baby Driver", a song by Kiss from Rock and Roll Over